The Women's 400 metre freestyle S10 event at the 2020 Paralympic Games took place on 1 September 2021, at the Tokyo Aquatics Centre.

Final

References

Swimming at the 2020 Summer Paralympics
2021 in women's swimming